Keith Harris may refer to:

 Keith Harris (ventriloquist) (1947–2015), English ventriloquist
 Keith Harris (rugby league) (born 1954), Australian rugby league footballer
 Keith R. Harris (born 1953), English financier
 Keith Harris (cricketer) (born 1957), English cricketer
 Keith Harris (artist manager) (born 1951), British music industry consultant and artist manager
 Keith Harris (record producer) (born 1976), American record producer, songwriter and musician

See also
 Keith Kahn-Harris, British sociologist